Vanant is the Avestan language name of a minor Zoroastrian divinity. The name literally means "conqueror", but in Zoroastrian tradition Vanant is the hypostasis of the "star of the west", variously identified with Altair, Fomalhaut, Vega, Sargas or Kappa Scorpii/Girtab.

Vanant may have its origins in the Sumero-Akkadian Vanand, perhaps incorporated in the Zoroastrian pantheon as a consequence of the close relations between Iran and Babylon during the late Achaemenid era. 

Vanant has no calendrical dedication (see Zoroastrian calendar), but is invoked together with the other astral divinities on the second and third days of the month. From amongst the hymns invoking divinities, Yasht 21 is dedicated to Vanant. The divinity is also invoked in the hymn dedicated to Tishtrya, another star yazata for whom Vanant is a constant companion.

In the Zoroastrian tradition, Vanant is considered to be a guardian of goodness. An invocation of the Vanant Yasht is believed to be a potent remedy for fighting evil.

Further reading

 

Yazatas